Serge Cornut (born 6 May 1948) is a French equestrian. He competed in two events at the 1992 Summer Olympics.

References

1948 births
Living people
French male equestrians
French dressage riders
Olympic equestrians of France
Equestrians at the 1992 Summer Olympics
Sportspeople from Haute-Savoie